Vitaliy Nikolayevich Buts (born 24 November 1986 in Mykolaiv) is a Ukrainian road bicycle racer, who currently rides for UCI Continental team . He has been riding since 1997 and turned professional in 2009 with the  team.

Major results
Source:

2006
 1st Trofeo Lampre Bernareggio
 3rd Coppa Città di Lonigo
 3rd Palazzolo Milanese
 3rd Gran Premio Sannazzaro
2007
 1st Circuito Guazzorese
 1st Stage 1 Giro Ciclistico Pesche Nettarine di Romagna
 2nd Coppa Comune di Piubega
 2nd Legnano Coppa Olivetti
 2nd Trofeo Torino-Biella
 2nd Trofeo Sportivi Magnaghesi
 3rd Trofeo Antonietto Rancilio
 3rd Gran Premio Sannazzaro
 9th Road race, UCI Under-23 Road World Championships
2008
 1st Overall Giro delle Regioni
1st Stage 6
 1st Boucles de la Soule
 1st Coppa Comune di Piubega
 1st Palazzolo Milanese
 1st Ronde du Pays Basque
 2nd Milano-Busseto
 2nd Castello Brianza
 2nd Memorial Angelo Fumagalli
 2nd Medaglia d'Oro Consorzio Marmisti Valpantena
 2nd Trofeo Broglia Marzé Quintino Soprana Baltigati
 3rd Circuit de la Nive
 3rd Trofeo Giacomo Larghi
 3rd Trofeo S.C. Marcallo Casone
 5th Trofeo Franco Balestra
 7th Gran Premio Palio del Recioto
 8th Coppa San Geo
 9th Gran Premio della Liberazione
2009
 3rd Overall Tour of Hainan
1st Stage 1
2013
 1st Overall Tour of Romania
1st Stages 1 (TTT) & 5
 1st Overall Grand Prix of Sochi
1st Stage 4
 1st Mayor Cup
 Five Rings of Moscow
1st Points classification
1st Stage 1
 2nd Road race, National Road Championships
 4th Race Horizon Park 2
 5th Overall Tour of Taihu Lake
 5th Grand Prix of Donetsk
 6th Overall Grand Prix of Adygeya
1st Stage 3
 7th Overall Tour of Szeklerland
1st  Points classification
1st Stage 1
 8th Overall Tour of Bulgaria
1st Stage 1b
2014
 1st  Road race, National Road Championships
 1st Race Horizon Park 1
 2nd Overall Tour d'Azerbaïdjan
1st  Points classification
 2nd Overall Tour of China I
1st Stage 4
 2nd Central European Tour Ibrány GP
 4th Race Horizon Park 3
 4th Central European Tour Budapest GP
 5th Overall Grand Prix of Adygeya
 6th Overall Grand Prix of Sochi
1st Stage 5
 6th Central European Tour Košice–Miskolc
 10th Overall Tour of China II
1st Mountains classification
2015
 1st Overall Black Sea Cycling Tour
1st Points classification
1st Stages 1 & 2
 1st Odessa Grand Prix 2
 1st Grand Prix of Vinnytsia
 2nd Overall Tour of Mersin
1st Points classification
1st Stage 4
 2nd Overall Tour of Małopolska
 2nd Race Horizon Park Classic
 2nd Memoriał Henryka Łasaka
 3rd Overall Course de Solidarność et des Champions Olympiques
 3rd Krasnodar–Anapa
 3rd Memorial Oleg Dyachenko
 4th Overall Tour of Yancheng Coastal Wetlands
 4th Coupe des Carpathes
 5th Overall Tour of Taihu Lake
 5th Moscow Cup
 5th Race Horizon Park Maidan
 5th Puchar Ministra Obrony Narodowej
 6th Odessa Grand Prix 1
2016
 1st Belgrade Banjaluka I
 1st Race Horizon Park for Peace
 1st Stage 6 Tour of Bulgaria
 2nd Road race, National Road Championships
 2nd Overall Tour of Ukraine
1st Stage 2a (TTT)
 2nd Overall Okolo Slovenska
 2nd Belgrade Banjaluka II
 2nd Odessa Grand Prix
 3rd Overall Tour of Qinghai Lake
1st Stage 4
 4th Race Horizon Park Classic
 5th Tour de Ribas
 7th Memoriał Romana Siemińskiego
2017
 1st  Road race, National Road Championships
 1st Overall Tour of Ukraine
1st  Points classification
1st Stages 1 & 2 (TTT)
 1st Overall Tour of Bulgaria South
1st Stages 1, 2 & 3
 2nd Odessa Grand Prix
 4th Overall Tour of Taihu Lake
 4th Race Horizon Park Maidan
 5th Race Horizon Park Classic
 6th Overall Tour of Bulgaria North
 8th Race Horizon Park for Peace
 9th Overall Tour d'Azerbaïdjan
 10th Visegrad 4 Bicycle Race – GP Polski
2018
 1st Stage 2 Tour of Małopolska
 5th Grand Prix Doliny Baryczy Milicz
 6th Memoriał Romana Siemińskiego
 7th Overall Course de Solidarność et des Champions Olympiques
 7th Memoriał Andrzeja Trochanowskiego
 8th Memorial Grundmanna I Wizowskiego
2019
 2nd Tour de Ribas
 2nd Horizon Park Race Maidan
 3rd Overall Tour of Black Sea
 4th Overall Tour of Małopolska
 4th Chabany Race
 4th Grand Prix Velo Alanya
 5th Road race, European Games
 6th Horizon Park Race for Peace
 6th Grand Prix Justiniano Hotels
 7th Horizon Park Race Classic
 8th Odessa Grand Prix
2020
 1st Grand Prix Velo Erciyes
 2nd Grand Prix Central Anatolia
 3rd Grand Prix Cappadocia
 5th Grand Prix Develi
 6th Road race, National Road Championships
 6th GP Manavgat
 7th GP Antalya
 8th Grand Prix Gazipaşa
 8th Grand Prix World's Best High Altitude
2021
 1st  Mountains classification Presidential Tour of Turkey
 5th Overall Tour of Mevlana
 6th Grand Prix Velo Erciyes
 10th Grand Prix Gündoğmuş

References

External links
Vitaliy Buts at Daily Peloton

Ukrainian male cyclists
1986 births
Living people
Sportspeople from Mykolaiv
European Games competitors for Ukraine
Cyclists at the 2015 European Games
Cyclists at the 2019 European Games